All I Want may refer to:

Music

Albums 
 All I Want (PSD album)
 All I Want (The Reverb Junkie album)
 All I Want (Tim McGraw album)

Songs 
 "All I Want" (702 song)
 "All I Want" (A Day to Remember song)
 "All I Want" (Captain Hollywood Project song)
 "All I Want" (E'voke song)
 "All I Want" (Howard Jones song)
 "All I Want" (Kodaline song)
 "All I Want" (Melissa Tkautz song)
 "All I Want" (Mis-Teeq song)
 "All I Want" (The Offspring song)
 "All I Want" (Olivia Rodrigo song)
 "All I Want" (Skunk Anansie song)
 "All I Want" (Toad the Wet Sprocket song)
 "All I Want", by B.o.B from Underground Luxury
 "All I Want", by The Cure from Kiss Me, Kiss Me, Kiss Me
 "All I Want", by Disney from Song of the South
 "All I Want", by Doro from Angels Never Die
 "All I Want", by Echo & The Bunnymen from Heaven Up Here
 "All I Want", by Joni Mitchell from Blue
 "All I Want", by LCD Soundsystem from This Is Happening
 "All I Want", by The Lightning Seeds from Cloudcuckooland
 "All I Want", by The Mekons from I Love Mekons
 "All I Want", by Puressence from Only Forever
 "All I Want", by Ride from Weather Diaries
 "All I Want", by Saigon Kick from The Lizard
 "All I Want", by Sizzla from Soul Deep
 "All I Want", by Staind from The Illusion of Progress
 "All I Want", by Wet Wet Wet from Wet Wet Wet: The Greatest Hits
 "All I Want", by Younger Brother from The Last Days of Gravity
 "All I want", by Shaz Sparks from Shaz Sparks (formerly of DBA)

Other uses 
 All I Want (film), a 2002 coming-of-age dramedy
 All I Want (Rufus Wainwright DVD)